Irene H. Leverton (March 3, 1927July 23, 2017) was an American pilot and a member of the Mercury 13 project.

Life
She was a member of the Ninety-Nines.
In 1961, she was selected for the Women in Space Program.who was selected to be one of the "Mercury 13" project women, passed away July 23, 2017, at the age of 90 in Paulden, Ariz. A Chicago native, she was inducted into the Women in Aviation Hall of Fame in 1966 and the Arizona Aviation Hall of Fame in 2004. With an aviation career starting in 1944 and ending in 2011, she was a pilot, flight instructor and check pilot.

In 1961, Leverton was selected for what is now known as the “Mercury 13” project, a privately funded program that enlisted women to undergo some of the same physical and psychological tests as the “Mercury 7” male astronauts. Although it was never an official NASA program, members of the First Lady Astronaut Trainees (also known as FLATs) secretly trained to become astronauts for America's first human spaceflight program in the early 1960s.
In the 1980s, Leverton moved to Phoenix and then to Prescott, where she started her business, Aviation Resource Management in 1985. She was a certificated Federal Aviation Administration Airline Transport Pilot and worked with the Civil Air Patrol squadron in Prescott as a check-ride pilot.
She graduated from San Jose State College with an AA in 1976 later receiving her flight training from Embry–Riddle Aeronautical University.

References

External links
 Space invaders Salon
 The Women of the Mercury Era  Mercury 13
 Irene Leverton flew at a time when women weren't welcome in the pilot's seat Kingman Miner
 Aviation pioneer Irene Leverton Embry-Riddle Alumni Association
 Born to Fly: Cottonwood's Irene Leverton Leverton honored by aviation community The Verde Independent
 Achievers: Leverton continues more than 60 years of flying The Daily Courier

1927 births
2017 deaths
People from Chicago
American women aviators
San Jose State University alumni
Aviators from Illinois
Mercury 13
Embry–Riddle Aeronautical University alumni